The Scottish national basketball team is the basketball side that represents Scotland in international competition. They are organised by basketballscotland, the sport's governing body in Scotland, which in 2005, along with England and Wales merged to form the Great Britain national basketball team. The Scotland national team used to compete in the FIBA Europe's Division C. Scotland's direct affiliation to FIBA ended on 30 September 2016. To date, Scotland's main accomplishments were two qualifications to the EuroBasket, Europe's main basketball event. Further, the team won five bronze medals at the FIBA European Championship for Small Countries.

History

EuroBasket 1951
The Scottish team's first European championship competition was at EuroBasket 1951 in Paris. They lost their eight games and finished 16th place out of 18. They outranked Luxembourg, who had had the misfortune of being in a five-team preliminary group instead of a four-team group (and losing all of their games), and Romania, who had dropped out of the tournament at the last minute.

EuroBasket 1957
Six years later, at the EuroBasket 1957 in Sofia, Scotland competed much better.  There, the squad won one of its three preliminary round games to be relegated to the classification round.  The first match in that round pitted Scotland against Albania, who had also not yet achieved a victory in EuroBasket competition.  The Scots proved the better, 69–56.  Afterwards, they lost their next six matches but showed considerable improvement from the last tournament. They competed against Austria and West Germany the whole game until they finally ceded by one point and five points respectively to finish the classification round 1–6 in 15th place overall, ahead of Albania which they beat twice.

Competitions

Performance at EuroBasket

Performance at the Commonwealth Games

Melbourne 2006

Last roster
The following is the Scotland roster in the men's basketball tournament of the 2018 Commonwealth Games.

Past rosters
At the FIBA EuroBasket 2010 Division C:

Head coach position

See also
Kieron Achara
Robert Archibald
Iain MacLean
Boroughmuir Blaze
Great Britain national basketball team
Sport in Scotland
Basketball Scotland
Andrew Joseph Steven

References

External links
Scotland Basketball Records at FIBA Archive
Eurobasket.com – Scotland Men National Team
BasketballScotland
Presentation on Facebook

Basketball teams established in 1947
Men's national basketball teams
Basketball
 Scotland
1947 establishments in Scotland